C. John "Jack" Collins is an American academic and professor of Old Testament at Covenant Theological Seminary, where he has served since 1993.

He received a BS and MS (computer science and systems engineering) from the Massachusetts Institute of Technology, an M.Div. from Faith Evangelical Lutheran Seminary, and a Ph.D. in Biblical Hebrew linguistics from the School of Archaeology and Oriental Studies, University of Liverpool.

Collins was Old Testament Chairman for the ESV Study Bible, served as ESV Text Editor for The English-Greek Reverse Interlinear New Testament (Crossway, 2006), and is Old Testament Editor of the English Standard Version Study Bible.

He has published numerous articles in technical journals, as well as The New International Dictionary of Old Testament Theology and Exegesis. In 2000 his book on the theological and exegetical aspects of divine action, entitled The God of Miracles, was published by Crossway. It was also carried by InterVarsity Press in the UK the following year. His next book, Science and Faith: Friends or Foes? was also published by Crossway in 2003, followed by Genesis 1-4: A Linguistic, Theological, and Literary Commentary, published by P&R (2006).

Collins' recent book Did Adam and Eve Really Exist?: Who They Were and Why You Should Care (Crossway, 2011), in which he highlights the importance to Christian theology of believing that the biblical period fall of man was a historical event, and explores whether such a belief can be compatible with a Darwinian view of human origins.  Collins has been a prominent voice in recent discussion among evangelicals on this topic.

Works

Thesis

Books

Edited by

References

Living people
MIT School of Engineering alumni
Alumni of the University of Liverpool
Covenant Theological Seminary faculty
Year of birth missing (living people)